HMS Stonecrop was a  of the Royal Navy. She served during the Second World War. She was named after the stonecrop flower (Sedum).

She was built at Smith's Dock, South Bank-on-Tees and launched on 12 May 1941.

Service history
During the Second World War Stonecrop was a convoy escort and helped to sink two U-boats. On 2 April 1943 she and the sloop  sank  with depth charges off the coast of Portugal. Later that year on 30 August 1943 she and the sloop  sank  with depth charges in the North Atlantic east of the Azores.

Following the war she was sold on 17 May 1947 and became the merchant ship Silver King.

Notes

References

External links
 HMS Stonecrop (K 142), uboat.net

 

Flower-class corvettes of the Royal Navy
1941 ships